Virtuoso Italia 2005 is the second album by the New Brunswick Youth Orchestra (NBYO), released on November 28, 2005 (see 2005 in music). Recording of the album took place at the Auditorium Niccolò Paganini, in Parma, Italy. ALL TRACKS CONDUCTED BY PRINCIPAL CONDUCTOR Dr. James Mark.

Track listing

Note: Tracks 5–7 are separate movements of the "St. Croix Island Suite" (MacLean).

2005 albums
New Brunswick Youth Orchestra albums